Ptilomyiopsis is a genus of parasitic flies in the family Tachinidae.

Distribution
Brazil

Species
Ptilomyiopsis plumata (Curran, 1925)

References

Diptera of South America
Dexiinae
Tachinidae genera
Taxa named by Charles Henry Tyler Townsend